Seyyed Ahmad Razavi (1906–1971) was an Iranian engineer and politician.

Early life and education 
Razavi was born in 1906 in Kerman. Hailed from a landed upper-class family, his father headed Shaykhi community in Kerman. He was graduated from the French Lycée in Tehran, before he went to study mineral engineering in France.

Career 
Razavi attended the founding meeting of Tudeh Party of Iran in 1941 and initially supported the party. He was a co-founder of the Engineers’ Association, and its offshoot Iran Party. In 1946, he joined Democrat Party of Ahmad Qavam, and sided with its radical faction. The next year entered the 15th term of parliament representing his hometown Kerman, and became a well-known deputy after he boldly denounced the armed forces for "inefficiency, corruption, and political meddling".

In 1949, he was among founding members of the National Front. A staunch supporter of Mohammad Mosaddegh, he was elected to the 17th term of parliament as a senior Iran Party member, again from his hometown. During his tenure, he served as the deputy speaker, as well as the head of National Front's parliamentary group.

Exile and death 
After the 1953 coup d'état he was arrested and sentenced to life imprisonment, however he was released and permitted to go to exile. He died in 1971.

References 

1906 births
1971 deaths
People from Kerman
Democrat Party of Iran politicians
Iran Party politicians
National Front (Iran) MPs
Members of the 15th Iranian Majlis
Members of the 17th Iranian Majlis
Iranian expatriates in France
 prisoners and detainees of Iran